Philotheca glasshousiensis is a species of flowering plant in the family Rutaceae and is endemic to Queensland. It is a shrub with densely glandular-warty branchlets, lance-shaped to wedge-shaped leaves clustered near the ends of the branchlets and cream-coloured flowers arranged singly or in groups of up to five.

Description
The ten stamens are densely hairy.

Taxonomy and naming
This species was first formally described in 1926 by Karel Domin who gave it the name Eriostemon glasshousiensis and published the description in the journal Bibliotheca Botanica, from specimens collected by Cyril Tenison White in the Glasshouse Mountains in 1909. In 2005 Paul Irwin Forster changed the name to Philotheca glasshousiensis in the journal Austrobaileya.

Distribution and habitat
Philotheca glasshousiensis grows on rocky outcrops near the summit of the Glass House Mountains and north to Mt Cooroora, Cania Gorge National Park and Kroombit Tops National Park in south-eastern Queensland.

Conservation status
This philotheca is classified as of "least concern" under the Queensland Government Nature Conservation Act 1992.

References

glasshousiensis
Flora of Queensland
Sapindales of Australia
Plants described in 1926
Taxa named by Karel Domin